The MA is a straight-4 SOHC 0.9 L, 1.0 L, or 1.2 L engine first introduced in 1982 by Nissan, intended primarily for the K10 series Micra/March model. It shares design similarities with the older E engine, with an 8-valve hemispherical cylinder head but differs in that it uses an aluminium cylinder block. Unusually, the specified ignition timing for the MA10 running on the specified 90 RON gasoline was 2 degrees after top dead centre, reflecting a very high flame speed in the compact combustion chambers.

MA09ERT
The MA09ERT is a series-charged design (possessing both a turbocharger and a supercharger), an unusual design, particularly for Japanese vehicles. It powered the March Superturbo, March R, and the March Superturbo R.

The "Nissan PLASMA" (Powerful & Economic, Light, Accurate, Silent, Mighty, Advanced) improved performance and response by adding a supercharger to the (already turbocharged) MA10ET engine, which is a four-cylinder water-cooled OHC engine with a V-type valve arrangement and hemispherical combustion chambers, with sequential fuel injection.

The supercharger improved the response and the output in the low-rpm region (where turbochargers are typically less effective), and a new larger HT10 turbocharger aimed to improve output in the high-rpm regions. An intercooler and an updated intake manifold were added, the latter having a much larger throttle body and improved fuel rail. Other changes included a reduction of engine capacity from 987 cc to 930 cc; this strengthened the engine by increasing the bore wall thicknesses by 1 mm, and allowed cars using it to enter sub-1300 cc competition classes not otherwise possible due to conversion factors applied to forced induction engines.

The first prototypes of these engines were installed in the March Superturbo R/March R (EK10FR type) in 1988; shortly thereafter the engine was installed in the March Superturbo.

The MA09ERT was the first twincharged engine available in Japan; series charging combines the increased low-speed torque of supercharging with the increased high-speed torque and power of turbocharging. The presence of the supercharger also minimizes the effects of turbo lag.

Specifications
Water-cooled 4-cylinder inline, air-to-air intercooler
Valve system: SOHC, 2 valves per cylinder
Displacement: 
Bore: 
Stroke: 
Maximum power:  at 6500 rpm
Maximum torque:  at 5200 rpm
Compression ratio: 7.7:1
Weight: 
Size (length × width × height): 705×575×680 mm
Specific fuel consumption (net): 255 g/(PS･h) at 1200 rpm

MA10S

The MA10S is an engine with an electronically controlled carburetor. It was used in the Be-1 and 1982–1992 Micra (K10) and Pao. It has a hemi-head and, unusually, the spark is fired after top dead centre because of the very high flame speed in a compact engine with this head design. Compression in the  version was relatively low so that it was able to run on 90 RON petrol where available.

Specification
Water-cooled inline-4 cylinder
Displacement: 
Bore and stroke: 
Compression ratio: 9.5:1
Maximum power (net):  at 6000 rpm
Maximum torque (net): 75 N·m (55 lb·ft) at 3600 rpm
1-bbl carburettor
K10 March G series Middle 2 model MA10S engine photograph image

MA10E
The MA10E was used in the Nissan Saurus Jr.
Displacement: 
Maximum power:  at 5600 rpm

MA10ET

The Nissan MA10ET powered the Figaro and K10 March Turbo.
Displacement: 
Bore and stroke: 
Maximum power:  at 6000 rpm
Maximum torque:  at 4400 rpm
Compression ratio: 8.0:1
 Fuel supply device: Nissan Motor ECCS
 Power resource(V-AH): 12-30
March Turbo Type 1 (A-1) Engine Photograph

MA12S
The MA12S is the designation for the larger  engine. It was used in the Nissan Micra K10.
Displacement: 
Bore: 
Stroke: 
Maximum Power:  / 5600 rpm
Maximum Torque:  / 3600 rpm
Compression Ratio: 9.0:1

See also
 List of Nissan engines

References

MA

Straight-four engines
Gasoline engines by model